National Caotun Commercial & Industrial Vocational Senior High School (CTCIHS), also known as National Tsaotun Commercial & Industrial Vocational Senior High School (sometimes abbreviated TTVS), is located in the town of Caotun, Nantou County, Taiwan, Republic of China.

History 

 1955 – The school as well as its night school was founded as a division of Taichung Home Economics and Commercial High School.
 1959 – Admitted by Ministry of Education, the school was reformed into Taiwan Provincial Caotun Commercial Vocational School & Night School.
 1970 – Renamed Taiwan Provincial Caotun Commercial Vocation High School.
 1974 – Renamed Taiwan Provincial Caotun Commercial and Industrial High School & Night School while Industrial Dept. was established.
 1980 – The Dept. of Pipe Fitting, which was the only one in the schools of Taiwan, was established.
 1988 – The Dept. of Data Processing was established.
 1999 – The school was approved to move to new campus due to the 921 earthquake.
 2000 – Renamed National Caotun Commercial and Industrial High School & Night School (CTCIHS).
 2001 – New campus construction ceremony was held on Dec. 31.
 March, 2004 – New campus construction was completed and the president came in person to give away a board written: “Rebuild the Excellence”.
 September, 2004 – CTCIHS moved to the new campus and turn over a new leave.
 2007 – Rearrange the departments and the Dept. of Applied Foreign Language is established.

Department

Day School 

 Dept. of Business Affairs
 Dept. of Accounting Affairs
 Dept. of Data Processing
 Dept. of Applied Foreign Language
 Dept. of Machinery
 Dept. of Pipe Fitting
 Dept. of General Class (Major in Sport)
 Comprehensive Occupational Dept.

Continuing Education School 

 Dept. of Business Affairs
 Dept. of Data Processing
 Dept. of Machinery

Practical Skill Classes 

 Dept. of Industrial Engineering
 Dept. of Commercial Information

See also 
 National Taichung University of Science and Technology
 Vocational Education in Taiwan

External links 
  Official website

1955 establishments in Taiwan
Educational institutions established in 1955
Education in Nantou County
High schools in Taiwan